Kamenica is a village in the municipality of Gornji Milanovac, Serbia. According to the 2002 census, the village has a population of 37 people.

Notable people
Antonije Ristić-Pljakić, Serbian revolutionary

References

Populated places in Moravica District